Richard William Seay (November 30, 1904 – April 6, 1981) was an American Negro league baseball player who played from 1925 to 1947 for the Brooklyn Royal Giants, Newark Stars, Baltimore Black Sox, Philadelphia Stars, Newark Eagles, Pittsburgh Crawfords, and New York Black Yankees.

Seay was born in West New York, New Jersey, and died in Jersey City, New Jersey. He started his baseball career with the independent Pennsylvania Red Caps of New York, where he played shortstop alongside second baseman Chino Smith. Both Seay and Smith went to play professionally in the Negro leagues. Seay also served in the military during World War II from 1943 to 1944.

While a player with the Eagles, Seay was part of the "Million Dollar Infield," consisting of Seay, Ray Dandridge, Mule Suttles, and Willie Wells.

References

External links
 and Baseball-Reference Black Baseball stats and Seamheads

1904 births
1981 deaths
American military personnel of World War II
Baltimore Black Sox players
Baseball players from New Jersey
Brooklyn Royal Giants players
New York Black Yankees players
Newark Eagles players
Newark Stars players
Pennsylvania Red Caps of New York players
Philadelphia Stars players
Pittsburgh Crawfords players
People from West New York, New Jersey
Sportspeople from Hudson County, New Jersey
20th-century African-American sportspeople
African Americans in World War II
Baseball infielders